Sundargarh (Sl. No.: 9) is a Vidhan Sabha constituency of Sundergarh district.
Area of this constituency includes Sundargarh, Sundargarh block, Tangarpali block, Hemgiri block and seven Gram panchayats of Lephripada block.

Elected Members

16 elections held during 1951 to 2019. List of members elected from this constituency are:
 2019: Kusum Tete  (BJP)
 2014 (9): Jogesh Kumar Singh (Congress)
 2009 (9): Jogesh Kumar Singh (Congress)
 2004 (135): Sushama Patel (BJP, By election)
 2000: Sankarsan Naik (BJP)
 1995: Kishore Chandra Patel (Congress)
 1990: Bharatendra Sekhar Deo (Janata Dal)
 1985: Bharatendra Sekhar Deo (Janata Party)
 1980: Kishore Chandra Patel (Congress)
 1977: Kishore Chandra Patel (Congress)
 1974: Dibyalochan Sekhar Deo (Congress)
 1971: Dibyalochan Sekhar Deo (Orissa Jana Congress)
 1967: Harihar Patel (Swatantra Party)
 1961: Harihar Patel (Ganatantra Parishad)
 1957 (36): Udit Pratapsekhar Deo (Ganatantra Parisad), Gangadhar Pradhan (Ganatantra Parisad)
 1951: Krupanidhi Nayak (Congress), Harihar Patel (Ganatantra Parisad)

2019 Election Result
In 2019 election, Bharatiya Janata Party candidate Kusum Tete defeated Biju Janata Dal candidate Jogesh Kumar Singh by a margin of 7364 votes.

2014 Election Result
In 2014 election, Indian National Congress candidate Jogesh Kumar Singh defeated Biju Janata Dal candidate Kusum Tete by a margin of 12584 votes.

2009 Election Result
In 2009 election Indian National Congress candidate Jogesh Kumar Singh, defeated Biju Janata Dal candidate Sunil Kumar Singh Deo by 20,930 votes.

Notes

References

Sundergarh district
Assembly constituencies of Odisha